Considered a modern-day rivalry, the Sydney Swans and West Coast Eagles created one of the most thrilling rivalries of Australian football in recent years. In the nineteen months between September 2005 and March 2007, the sides met six times, including both Grand Finals and two Qualifying Finals; the final margins of these games were: 4, 4, 2, 1, 1 and 1.

Due to these close games, the Sydney–West Coast pairing now holds the following records:
 Lowest total points difference across six games: 13 (next lowest: South Melbourne vs Melbourne, 28 points, 1898–1900)
 Lowest total points difference across five games: 9 (next lowest: Hawthorn vs Collingwood, 19 points, 1958–1960)
 Lowest total points difference across four games: 5 (next lowest: Footscray vs Hawthorn, 7 points, 1931)
 Most consecutive one-point games: 3 (six pairings share with two)

Sydney and West Coast have met in two AFL Grand Finals, with both teams winning one apiece (Sydney in 2005 and West Coast in 2006). Both are regarded as some of the league's all-time great Grand Finals, with both games being decided by under one goal.

Since 2010, the two clubs have competed annually for the HMAS Sydney II Cup, honouring the 645 lives that were lost when the ship was sunk off the coast of Western Australia in November 1945. The Sydney Swans are the current holders of the cup, having defeated the Eagles by 63 points in Round 6, 2022.

Head to head
Since the Eagles joined the VFL in 1987, West Coast and Sydney have faced off 53 times, with the Swans leading 31–22. From these 53 games since 1987, the two clubs have played in five finals against each other, including the 2005 and 2006 Grand Finals. They have not played against each other in a final since the 2006 Grand Final.

Before 2005

The first VFL encounter

In Round 3 of the 1987 VFL season, Sydney and West Coast would play against each other, at Subiaco Oval, in their first encounter in the VFL. This was the second VFL game held at Subiaco.

This was also the first time that two VFL teams based outside of Victoria would play for points in VFL/AFL history.

West Coast 14.13 (97) were defeated by Sydney 18.16 (124).

Round 2, 2001
Future West Coast premiership ruckman Dean Cox made his AFL debut in Round 2 of the 2001 season, in a close match which the Eagles lost by just 15 points. This would mark the last time until 2006 that the Swans would defeat the Eagles, let alone win a premiership match, at Subiaco Oval.

West Coast 13.11 (89) were defeated by Sydney 15.14 (104).

Round 8, 2004
Dual West Coast premiership player Glen Jakovich played his last AFL game after announcing his retirement in the lead-up to the match. Jakovich kicked three goals as West Coast won only its third match of the season, defeating Sydney by 27 points but having to withstand a final-quarter Swans fightback to do so.

West Coast 18.16 (124) defeated Sydney 15.7 (97).

2004 Elimination Final

The first meeting between the Swans and Eagles in a final was the 2004 Elimination Final, only twelve months before the close rivalry began.

In a one-sided game at Telstra Stadium, a match played in thunderous conditions, Sydney thrashed West Coast by 41 points. Sydney 11.9.(75) defeated West Coast 4.10.(34) in front of a crowd of just over 40,000.

2005: A rivalry begins

2005 Qualifying Final
On 2 September 2005, Sydney and West Coast played the first in what would be a string of 6 games decided by under a goal.

In what was a tight game all day, West Coast hit the lead in the last quarter after a 14-point difference at 3-quarter time.

West Coast 10.9 (69) defeated Sydney 10.5 (65).

West Coast won through to the Preliminary Final where they defeated the Adelaide Crows, whilst Sydney was forced to play the following week where they defeated Geelong before beating St Kilda in the Preliminary Final.

2005 Grand Final

Round 15, 2006
After leading most of the day, Sydney lost the replay of the preceding year's Grand Final when West Coast kicked 6 goals to 1 in the second half to win by 2 points at Subiaco Oval.

West Coast 9.13 (67) defeated Sydney 9.11 (65).

2006 Qualifying Final
In front of 43,000 people at Subiaco, Sydney got over the line by a single point in a game where Michael O'Loughlin kicked a goal in the dying moments before interacting with Eagles fans in the front row behind the goals.

Sydney 13.7 (85) defeated West Coast 12.12 (84).

Sydney won through to the Preliminary Final where they defeated the Fremantle Dockers, whilst West Coast were forced to play the following week where they defeated the Western Bulldogs before beating Adelaide in the Preliminary Final.

2006 Grand Final

Round 1, 2007
In what was literally a replay of the Grand Final, West Coast escaped with another one-point victory after Sydney managed to kick 7 goals to one in the second half at ANZ Stadium.

This was the last match in a string of 6 where games were decided by under a goal.

West Coast 11.8 (74) defeated Sydney 10.13 (73)

Round 16, 2007
The two sides again managed to have yet another close match; however, for the first time in 7 matches, the winning margin would be over 5 points. This time Sydney would kick six goals to three in the final quarter to go down by 12 points. This was also Ben Cousins' first game for the 2007 season after a controversial off-season. This would stand as West Coast's last win over Sydney until Round 17, 2015.

West Coast 16.16 (112) defeated Sydney 15.10 (100).

2008–present: Swans dominance

Barry Hall and Brent Staker
In round four, 2008, Barry Hall made headlines when he punched West Coast's Brent Staker in the jaw. Staker's parents had called for Hall to be suspended for the remainder of the 2008 season, but Hall was only suspended for seven weeks. Sydney broke the trend of close games between the sides winning this match 16.11.(107) to 5.15.(45); it was their biggest win over the Eagles since 2000.

Swans comeback
Another classic was played out in Round 11, 2008, when Sydney overturned a 36-point halftime deficit to win at Subiaco Oval, their first at the venue in any home-and-away season since 2001.

West Coast kicked 6 goals to none in the first quarter and carried the lead into the halftime break. The Swans managed to kick 4 goals to none in the third term before kicking the final three goals of the match, with the last coming at the 31-minute mark, to win by 5 points.

Sydney 12.11 (83) defeated West Coast 11.12 (78).

Another 5-point thriller
In round eight, 2009, Sydney once again beat the Eagles by under a goal, this time at ANZ Stadium. The Eagles hit the front late in the final term after facing a 19-point difference at 3-quarter time.

The Eagles looked to have pinched the game away from the Swans before a late goal from Kieren Jack put the Swans in front in the dying minutes to save another game for the Swans.

Sydney 16.10 (106) defeated West Coast 15.11 (101).

Swans again in 2011
With 4 minutes to play in round 3, 2011, scores were level as the sides once again battled out a see-sawing event in Perth. Andrejs Everitt of Sydney kicked the final two goals of the match, with the last one only seconds before the final siren. Sydney were the only team to defeat the Eagles on its home ground in season 2011.

Sydney 15.11 (101) defeated West Coast 13.10 (88).

Adam Goodes booing incident
Round 17, 2015, saw West Coast end its eight-game losing streak against the Swans with a 52-point victory, its biggest win over the club since 2005. However, the match was marred by constant booing from pro-Eagles fans towards Swans player Adam Goodes, who subsequently took leave from the club for one week following the incident.

West Coast 15.13 (103) defeated Sydney 7.9 (51).

The first game at Perth Stadium
It was announced on 26 October 2017 that the two sides will contest the first ever AFL premiership match at the new Perth Stadium in round one of the 2018 AFL season.

Sydney 18.7 (115) defeated West Coast 13.8 (86).

Friday night in Sydney
Despite losing the first game of the 2018 season, West Coast won the next 10 in a row. Going into the match, west coast were 1st, with Sydney in 3rd on the AFL ladder.

Sydney 10.12 (72) defeated West Coast 7.15 (57).

An upset in 2019
Despite the West Coast Eagles being the reigning premiers, and the Sydney Swans suffering a decline in on-field performance, the Swans were able to defeat the Eagles by 45 points at the Sydney Cricket Ground, with Lance Franklin kicking a goal from the boundary line on the final siren. The win extended the Eagles' hoodoo at the ground to two decades.

Sydney 18.8 (116) defeated West Coast 10.11 (71).

Neutral territory in 2021
A COVID-19 outbreak in Sydney saw the fixtured round 16, 2021 match between the Swans and Eagles shifted from the Sydney Cricket Ground to Kardinia Park in Geelong, where the Swans recorded their largest ever win over the Eagles, winning by 92 points.

Sydney 18.10 (118) defeated West Coast 3.8 (26).

Swans run riot on Good Friday
In just their second meeting at Optus Stadium, the Swans made it two from two against the Eagles at the ground, kicking the first nine goals of the match and keeping the Eagles scoreless in the first quarter (the first time this had happened at home in club history) en route to a 63-point victory, which was achieved without injured forward Lance Franklin.

Sydney 18.13 (121) defeated West Coast 9.4 (58).

Sydney–West Coast rivalry results

V/AFL Results

Players who played for both clubs
Scott Watters (West Coast 1989–92, Sydney 1993–1994)
Jason Ball (West Coast 1992–99, Sydney 2000–2005)
Mark Seaby (West Coast 2004–09, Sydney 2010–2012)
Matthew Spangher (West Coast 2008–10, Sydney 2011–2012)
Mitch Morton (West Coast 2005–07, Sydney 2012–2013)
Lewis Jetta (Sydney 2010–15, West Coast 2016–)
Callum Sinclair (West Coast 2013–15, Sydney 2016–)
Tom Hickey (West Coast 2019-20, Sydney 2021-)

See also
Rivalries in the Australian Football League

References

Australian Football League rivalries
Sydney Swans
West Coast Eagles